Para-Ski International was a Canadian aircraft manufacturer, based in Mascouche, Quebec. The company specialized in the design and construction of powered parachutes.

The company was formed in 1996 by Joe Albanese and Jacques Fleury. The company went out of business in about 2011.

Para-Skis designs have won numerous awards, including the "Ultralight Innovation" award at Sun 'n Fun 1999, the "Best Type Para-Wing" award at Sun 'n Fun 2000, the "Best Flex Wing" award at Oshkosh AirVenture 2000, the "Ultralight Innovation" award at Sun 'n Fun 2002, the "Best Commercial Ultralight Award" at Sun 'n Fun 2003 and the "Reserve Grand Champion Ultralight Award" at Sun 'n Fun 2003.

Aircraft

References

External links
Company website archives on Archive.org

Defunct aircraft manufacturers of Canada
Powered parachutes
Mascouche